The 2015 Battle of Konduga was fought on 2 March 2015 between Nigerian army and Boko Haram insurgents. The battle started when Boko Haram attacked town of Konduga at 7 AM and lasted until 1 PM when Nigerian military backed by Nigerian air force repulsed last of the insurgents with injuries. One Nigerian soldier, and 73 Boko Haram insurgents were killed in the battle.

References 

Conflicts in 2015
Boko Haram attacks
Boko Haram insurgency
Battles in 2015